Palladian Villas may refer to:
 Villas in the Palladian style inspired by Andrea Palladio 
 Villas designed by Andrea Palladio, Palladian villas of Veneto